The American India Foundation (AIF, founded 2001) is a nonprofit American organization working in India. It is one of the largest secular, non-partisan American organizations supporting development work in India. AIF is committed to improving the lives of India’s underprivileged, with a special focus on women, children, and youth. It does this through high impact interventions in education, health, and livelihoods, because poverty is multidimensional. AIF’s unique value proposition is its broad engagement between communities, civil society, and expertise, thereby building a lasting bridge between the United States and India. Till date, AIF has impacted 6.7 million lives across 26 states of India.

It also runs the William J. Clinton Fellowship now renamed as AIF Banyan Impact Fellowship for Service to India on May 11, 2009, which sends skilled young Americans in an immersive volunteer service program training and placing young professionals to support development organizations across India for 10 months.

History
Founded in 2001 at the initiative of US President Bill Clinton following a suggestion from Indian Prime Minister Atal Bihari Vajpayee, by a group of Indian-Americans responding to the Gujarat earthquake.  AIF has impacted the lives of 6.7 million of India’s poor by providing access to high-quality education,  skilling for youth, and protecting the health of mothers and their children, while building the next generation of global leaders through service.

It has offices in New York City and California, twelve chapters across the U.S., and India operations headquartered in New Delhi.

AIF's Work
The American India Foundation focuses on catalyzing social and economic change in India and building a lasting bridge between the United States and India through high-impact interventions in education, livelihoods, public health, and leadership development. Working closely with local communities, AIF partners with NGOs to develop and test innovative solutions and with governments to create and scale sustainable impact.

Education
AIF’s education programs ensure that children in neglected regions and under resourced schools have access to high-quality educational opportunities and gain critical life skills alongside 21st century knowledge to prepare them for success in today’s globalized world.

Learning and Migration Program (LAMP)
AIF's Learning and Migration Program (LAMP) provides access to quality education opportunities to children in areas of seasonal migration, while also advocating to communities and governments the universal right to education. The program has impacted over 580,000 children in 13 states of India.

Digital Equalizer Program
The Digital Equalizer Program utilizes technology to bridge the educational and digital divide in India by transforming under-resourced schools into dynamic places to teach and learn through collaborative, project-based learning. The program has impacted over 4 million children across 15 states of India.

Public Health

Maternal & Newborn Survival Initiave (MANSI)
MANSI utilizes a public-private partnership model to reduce maternal and child mortality by providing resources and support, thus empowering local communities to care for their mothers and children while improving the local health systems. The program has helped serve over 171,000 expecting women, 133,000 new born babies and train over 2900 ASHAs (Accredited Social Health Activists).

Livelihoods
AIF works closely with the public and private sector to create inclusive and sustainable livelihoods for individuals, families, and communities across India with a long-term goal of equalizing the informal and formal sectors to provide equitable opportunities for all citizens.

Market Aligned Skills Training (MAST)
AIF's MAST program provides underprivileged youth with skills training and access to formal employment opportunities. The program has helped train over 124,000 disadvantaged young people. As part AIF's COVID response, AIF has launched Project Entre-prerana which will be a systemic transformation intervention aimed at reviving the livelihoods of 1 million street vendors, micro entrepreneurs in India, all of whom have been badly affected by the Covid-19 pandemic.

Ability Based Livelihood Empowerment (ABLE)
The Ability Based Livelihoods Empowerment (ABLE) program helps train persons with disabilities and facilitates their entry into the job market through advocacy, promoting inclusive growth in India. Through this program AIF has served over 16,000 persons with disabilities.

AIF's Emergency Response 
In cases of major national disasters in India, AIF has been involved in relief and rehabilitation efforts. It has undertaken several campaigns for relief and rehabilitation:

 In 2001, after the Gujarat earthquake
 In 2004, after the tsunami
 In 2005, after the Kashmir earthquake
 In 2019, after the Pulwama attack
In 2020 and 2021 during the COVID-19 pandemic

AIF takes a multi-phased approach to disaster relief: relief, reconstruction and rehabilitation. AIF's focus is the long-term rehabilitation of communities, and it dedicates most of its resources to this phase. In Gujarat and Tamil Nadu, AIF funded organizations in affected communities for up to three years following the earthquake so that NGO partners could identify long-term solutions to improve the lives of people affected by disaster.

References

Development charities based in the United States
South Asian American organizations
Organizations established in 2001
Foreign charities operating in India
2001 establishments in the United States